The Wisconsin Point Light is a lighthouse located in Superior, on Wisconsin Point, in Douglas County, Wisconsin, United States.

This sand bar makes the Duluth–Superior Harbor one of the safest harbors in the world. It is "reputedly the longest freshwater sand bar in the world" and is split by this opening near its center, where the lighthouse is located. The Minnesota side of the opening is known as "Minnesota Point" (Park Point) and the Wisconsin side is known as "Wisconsin Point." It was added to the National Register of Historic Places in 2007. It stands erect at 70 ft. tall.

History

The original Fresnel lens was manufactured by Sautter, Lemonnier, and Company of Paris in 1890.  It was replaced with a DCB-224 aero beacon manufactured by the Carlisle & Finch Company.

It is an active navigational aid and is known as the South Breakwater Light by the United States Coast Guard in the Volume VII light list and the United States Geological Survey Geographic Names Information System.

It is located on the southern Superior Harbor entry breakwall. The Saint Louis River, which rises in Minnesota, becomes the Saint Louis Bay, then flows into Superior Bay and exits into Lake Superior via the ship canals, at each end of (Park Point) Minnesota Point.

In July 2019, the lighthouse superstructure was put up for sale in an online auction by the U.S. GSA.  The breakwater upon which it sits and the navigational aid housed within would remain U.S. Government property after the sale.

References

Further reading

 Havighurst, Walter (1943) The Long Ships Passing: The Story of the Great Lakes, Macmillan Publishers.
 Oleszewski, Wes, Great Lakes Lighthouses, American and Canadian: A Comprehensive Directory/Guide to Great Lakes Lighthouses, (Gwinn, Michigan: Avery Color Studios, Inc., 1998) .
 
 Wright, Larry and Wright, Patricia, Great Lakes Lighthouses Encyclopedia Hardback (Erin: Boston Mills Press, 2006) .

External links

Aerial photos of Wisconsin Point, South Breakwater Light, Marina.com.

Lighthouse friends, Wisconsin Point Light article
Satellite view, Superior Entry South Breakwater (Wisconsin Point) Light, by Google.com.

Lighthouses completed in 1913
Buildings and structures in Douglas County, Wisconsin
Lighthouses on the National Register of Historic Places in Wisconsin
Tourist attractions in Douglas County, Wisconsin
Superior, Wisconsin
1913 establishments in Wisconsin
National Register of Historic Places in Douglas County, Wisconsin